Velavan Senthilkumar, (born 26 March 1998 in Salem, Tamil Nadu) is a professional squash player who represents India. He reached a career-high world ranking of World No. 101 in November 2021.

Senthilkumar is the 2016 Asian Junior Squash champion and the 2017 British Junior Open champion. He bagged his first PSA title in April 2018 at the Madison Open in Wisconsin.

Senthilkumar is currently a student at Columbia University and a member of the men's squash team. He is set to graduate in 2022.

References

External links 

Living people
1998 births
Indian male squash players
People from Salem, Tamil Nadu
Racket sportspeople from Tamil Nadu
Columbia Lions men's squash players
Indian expatriates in the United States
Columbia University people
Squash players at the 2022 Commonwealth Games
Commonwealth Games competitors for India